Suncroft is a Gaelic football club in Suncroft, County Kildare, Ireland, winner of the day Senior Hurling championship in 1974 and the Senior Football League in 1952. Paul Doyle was selected on the Kildare Gaelic football team of the millennium. Anthony Rainbow was an All Stars Award winner in 2000.

History
In 2009, Suncroft completed one of the biggest shocks in the Kildare Senior Football Championship by beating the highly fancied Sarsfields by 2-12 to 0-15 on All Ireland Sunday morning in glorious sunshine at St Conleths Park.

Notable players
 Fionn Dowling

Honours
 Kildare Senior Hurling Championship: Winners 1974.
 Kildare Senior Football League (1) 1952
 Kildare Senior Football Championship Semi-finalists 1995, 2009
 Kildare Intermediate Football Championship (4) 1944, 1950, 1989, 2007
 Kildare Junior A Football Championship: 1977
 Kildare Junior Football Championship: 1930, 1962
 Kildare Minor B Football Championship 2015
 Kildare Minor Football Championship (3) 1944, 1948, 1949
 Keogh Cup Champions 2003

Bibliography
 Kildare GAA: A Centenary History, by Eoghan Corry, CLG Chill Dara, 1984,  hb  pb
 Kildare GAA yearbook, 1972, 1974, 1978, 1979, 1980 and 2000- in sequence especially the Millennium yearbook of 2000
 Soaring Sliothars: Centenary of Kildare Camogie 1904-2004 by Joan O'Flynn Kildare County Camogie Board.

External links
Kildare GAA site
Kildare GAA club sites
Kildare on Hoganstand.com

Gaelic games clubs in County Kildare
Hurling clubs in County Kildare
Gaelic football clubs in County Kildare